Langebottfjellet  is a mountain located in the municipalities of Ål and Hemsedal in Buskerud, Norway.

External links
Langebottfjellet  Coor URL

Ål
Hemsedal
Mountains of Viken